Dave's Picks Volume 25 is a three-CD live album by the rock band the Grateful Dead. It contains the complete concert recorded on November 6, 1977, at Broome County Veterans Memorial Arena in Binghamton, New York. It was produced as a limited edition of 18,000 copies, and was released on January 26, 2018.

Critical reception
On AllMusic, Timothy Monger said, "The 25th volume of the long-running archival Grateful Dead series Dave's Picks marks the first official release of an oft-bootlegged show from the waning days of 1977.... The energy remains high throughout both sets, which include sprightly takes on favorites like "Jack Straw", "The Music Never Stopped", and other standards from that era's repertoire."

In Glide Magazine, Doug Collette wrote, "Binghamton, NY 11/6/77 is yet another cull from the treasure trove from whence came Cornell May 1977, a remarkably true-to-life recording by Betty Cantor-Jackson that finds the band on the proverbial fire during a show spreading throughout the three CDs of which it's comprised.... The compulsion is so great to sit down and listen ever so closely, to the exclusion of any other sensory input."

Track listing
Disc 1
First set:
 "Mississippi Half-Step Uptown Toodeloo" (Jerry Garcia, Robert Hunter) – 12:22
 "Jack Straw" (Bob Weir, Hunter) – 7:18
 "Tennessee Jed" (Garcia, Hunter) – 9:24
 "Mexicali Blues" > (Weir, John Perry Barlow) – 3:19
 "Me and My Uncle" (John Phillips) – 3:30
 "Friend of the Devil" (Garcia, Hunter) – 9:38
 "New Minglewood Blues" (traditional, arranged by Grateful Dead) – 5:34
 "Dupree's Diamond Blues" (Garcia, Hunter) – 6:11
 "Passenger" (Phil Lesh, Peter Monk) – 4:43
 "Dire Wolf" (Garcia, Hunter) – 5:18
 "The Music Never Stopped" (Weir, Barlow) – 8:05
Disc 2
Second set:
 "Samson and Delilah" (traditional, arranged by Grateful Dead) – 9:10
 "Sunrise" (Donna Jean Godchaux) – 4:45
 "Scarlet Begonias" > (Garcia, Hunter) – 10:46
 "Fire on the Mountain" > (Mickey Hart, Hunter) – 9:36
 "Good Lovin'" (Rudy Clark, Artie Resnick) – 7:09
Disc 3
 "St. Stephen" > (Garcia, Lesh, Hunter) – 7:55
 "Drums" > (Hart, Bill Kreutzmann) – 2:48
 "Not Fade Away" > (Buddy Holly, Norman Petty) – 9:44
 "Wharf Rat" > (Garcia, Hunter) – 11:09
 "St. Stephen" > (Garcia, Lesh, Hunter) – 1:04
 "Truckin'" (Garcia, Weir, Lesh, Hunter) – 11:32
Encore:
"Johnny B. Goode" (Chuck Berry) – 5:09

Personnel
Grateful Dead
Jerry Garcia – guitar, vocals
Donna Jean Godchaux – vocals
Keith Godchaux – keyboards
Mickey Hart – drums
Bill Kreutzmann – drums
Phil Lesh – bass, vocals
Bob Weir – guitar, vocals
Production
Produced by Grateful Dead
Produced for release by David Lemieux
Mastering: Jeffrey Norman
Recording: Betty Cantor-Jackson
Art direction, design: Steve Vance
Cover art: Tim McDonagh
Photos: Bob Minkin
Liner notes: Rob Bleetstein, David Lemieux
Executive producer: Mark Pinkus
Associate producers: Doran Tyson, Ivette Ramos
Tape research: Michael Wesley Johnson
Tapes provided through the assistance of ABCD Enterprises, LLC

Charts

See also
Dick's Picks Volume 34 - Features the entire show from the night before on November 5, 1977, as well as selections from November 2 during the same stretch of shows.

References

25
Rhino Records live albums
2018 live albums